Alaeen (also Romanized as Alain, ‘Alā’īn) is a village in Lavasan-e Bozorg Rural District, Lavasanat District, Shemiranat County, Tehran Province, Iran. At the 2006 census, its population was 99, in 34 families.

References 

Populated places in Shemiranat County